The 1951 Miami Redskins football team was an American football team that represented Miami University in the Mid-American Conference (MAC) during the 1951 college football season. In its first season under head coach Ara Parseghian, Miami compiled a 7–3 record (3–1 against MAC opponents), finished in second place in the MAC, and outscored all opponents by a combined total of 229 to 159.

Donald Green was the team captain.  The team's statistical leaders included John Pont with 883 rushing yards, Jim Root with 894 passing yards, and Clive Rush with 398 receiving yards.

Schedule

References

Miami
Miami RedHawks football seasons
Miami Redskins football